The Sparkasse Hagen tower, often referenced as Langer Oskar (Long Oskar) by locals, was a  skyscraper in the city centre of Hagen, North Rhine-Westphalia, Germany.  
The building served as the main office tower and part of the headquarters of the resident Sparkasse, Sparkasse Hagen. Built in the early 1970s it was a regional landmark for nearly three decades until demolition in 2004. It was replaced by a lower building complex, called Sparkassen-Karree Hagen, which was inaugurated in 2006.

Construction
Construction began 1 August 1972 and finished on 29 November 1975. It was inaugurated on 29 November 1975. It was named after the director of the savings bank at that time, Oskar Specht. The architect of the building was Karl-Heinz Zernikow from Hagen.

The cultivated surface amounted to  the effective area  (office surface: .

Water leakage penetrated, and damaged building insulation. Repairs would have required further measures, including improvements to the air conditioning system and installation of a second stairway for fire safety reasons. Repair costs were estimated at €42 million. It was estimated that demolition would cost 5 million euro and construction of a new building would cost €16.8 million. Therefore, it was decided to demolish the current building and construct a new one.

Demolition
The building was explosively imploded at 10:53 on 7 March 2004, in the then-largest and riskiest breakup of a multistoried building in Europe. 1,450 explosive charges weighing 250 kilograms were used in timed sequence to cause 26,000 tons concrete and steel to first fold and then collapse into a predetermined  bed without damaging neighboring structures. The successful breakup is considered as master achievement of the specialty firm from Thuringia and receives an entry in the Guinness World Records.

References

External links

Details on the page of the Thüringer Sprenggesellschaft (implosion specialty firm)
Photo galleries on www.redoxon.de: Langer Oskar before the demolition and The Demolition of Langer Oskar
Langer Oskar sheet of construction paper

Buildings and structures in Hagen
Office buildings completed in 1975
1975 establishments in Germany
2004 disestablishments in Germany
Buildings and structures demolished in 2004
Demolished buildings and structures in Germany
Skyscraper office buildings in Germany
Former skyscrapers
Buildings and structures demolished by controlled implosion